Stefano Lari (born 15 April 1961) is an Italian rower. He competed in the men's quadruple sculls event at the 1984 Summer Olympics.

References

External links
 

1961 births
Living people
Italian male rowers
Olympic rowers of Italy
Rowers at the 1984 Summer Olympics
Place of birth missing (living people)